Charles "Charlie" Mays Sr. (February 3, 1941 – April 11, 2005) was an American Olympic athlete and Democratic Party politician who represented the 31st Legislative District in the New Jersey General Assembly. He was an eleven-time Amateur Athletic Union (AAU) All-American, nine-time AAU champion in the long jump and six-time champion in the 440-yard dash. Mays was AAU Track and Field Athlete of the Year on three occasions, and a two-time NCAA champion in the long jump and the mile relay. He competed in the long jump at the 1968 Summer Olympics in Mexico City.

Mays grew up in Jersey City, New Jersey and competed in track while at Lincoln High School. He served six years on the city council in Jersey City and two terms in the New Jersey General Assembly.

Mays founded the Black Athletes Hall of Fame in 1973 and later served as its executive director.

Mays was inducted to the University of Maryland Eastern Shore Hawks Hall of Fame in 1982. In 2007, Hudson County, New Jersey named the running track at Lincoln Park in his honor.

References

1941 births
2005 deaths
American athlete-politicians
Lincoln High School (New Jersey) alumni
Politicians from Jersey City, New Jersey
Sportspeople from Jersey City, New Jersey
Track and field athletes from New Jersey
American male sprinters
Olympic track and field athletes of the United States
Athletes (track and field) at the 1968 Summer Olympics
African-American state legislators in New Jersey
University of Maryland Eastern Shore alumni
Democratic Party members of the New Jersey General Assembly
New Jersey city council members
20th-century American politicians
20th-century African-American politicians
21st-century African-American people